Muenster Independent School District is a public school district based in Muenster, Texas (USA).

In 2009, the school district was rated "recognized" by the Texas Education Agency.

Schools

Muenster High School (Grades 9-12) - also serves students from the Sivells Bend Independent School District
Muenster Junior High School (Grades 7-8)
Muenster Elementary School (Grades PK-6)

Athletics 
The Muenster Hornets fielded their first football team in 1948 and have fielded one every single season since then. The Hornets' first big rival were the St. Jo Panthers. These two teams battled annually for the Coveted Horseshoe until the trophy was retired in the late 1950s. The 1968 and 69 seasons were historic for the Hornets. In 1968 they finished undefeated in their district and won the bi-district title over Lake Dallas by a count of 38–6. They repeated as bi-district champs in 1969, this time edging Lake Dallas 29–28. It was during this time Muenster began to develop a rivalry with the local Lindsay Knights. The annual match up has taken the name of the "Kraut Bowl" due to the communities' strong German heritage. 1976 remains as one Muenster's best teams. They swept district once again, and advanced to the Quarter Finals before falling to De Leon 20–14. For the larger part of the late 20th century Muenster remained a formidable opponent, but not an elite team. They finally made the transformation in 2010, with the hiring of Brady Carney. Muenster finished undefeated, beat Lindsay twice, and advanced to the Quarter Finals for the first time in 34 years. The 2011 team was even better. Once again the Hornets ran the table, crushed Lindsay twice, and advanced to the Quarter Finals, where they lost in the waning minutes to Mart 35–29. The 2015 team advanced as far as the State semi finals, but were beaten by Bremond the 2014 and 2015 class 2a division 2 Texas State Champions. The 2017 Hornets became the first in Texas to win three UIL Class 2A state championships: in baseball, basketball and football.

References

External links
Muenster ISD

School districts in Cooke County, Texas